Masatoshi Takahira (born 26 July 1937) is a Japanese wrestler. He competed in the men's Greco-Roman featherweight at the 1960 Summer Olympics.

References

1937 births
Living people
Japanese male sport wrestlers
Olympic wrestlers of Japan
Wrestlers at the 1960 Summer Olympics
People from Nagasaki